Ulises Antonio Rayo López (born January 12, 1994) is a Nicaraguan footballer who plays as a forward for Real Madriz and the Nicaragua national team.

He debuted internationally on 11 October 2019 in the CONCACAF Nations League and scored his first goal for Nicaragua in a 3-1 victory against Dominica.

International goals
Scores and results list Nicaragua's goal tally first.

References

External links
 

1994 births
Living people
Nicaraguan men's footballers
Nicaragua international footballers
Association football forwards
C.D. Walter Ferretti players
Deportivo Ocotal players
Real Madriz FC players
Nicaraguan Primera División players
People from Estelí Department